Mika Erkkilä (born 4 March 1990) is a Finnish professional ice hockey player who played with HPK in the SM-liiga during the 2010–11 season.

See also
Ice hockey in Finland

References

External links

1990 births
Finnish ice hockey forwards
HPK players
Living people
People from Hämeenlinna
Sportspeople from Kanta-Häme